The governor of Voronezh Oblast is the highest official of Voronezh Oblast, a federal subject of Russia. The governor heads the executive branch in the region.

History of office 
Until 1996, the head of the regional administration was the highest official in Voronezh Oblast. From 1996 to 2005, the governor was elected by the residents of Voronezh Oblast. From 2005 to 2012, elections were abolished and governor was appointed by the Voronezh Oblast Duma on the proposal of the President of Russia.

List of officeholders

References 

Politics of Voronezh Oblast
 
Voronezh